Carl Joachim Classen (15 August 1928 - 29 September 2013) was a German classical scholar.

Biography 
Classen studied classics at Göttingen and Hamburg. His academic teachers include Ernst Zinn and Bruno Snell in Hamburg and Kurt Latte in Göttingen. After being promoted to Dr. phil. in 1952 he took the first and second state examination in 1952 and 1956, respectively. He attained the B. Litt. at the University of Oxford in 1956 and worked as a lecturer of classics at the University of Ibadan for three years. After his return to Germany (in 1959) he worked as a lecturer at the Göttingen university, completing his Habilitation in 1961.

From 1966 on Classen held classics chairs at three universities: In 1966 he was called to one of the two newly instituted chair of classics at the Berlin Institute of Technology (Technische Universität Berlin). From there he went to Würzburg in 1969, until going to Göttingen in 1973 where he stayed the remainder of his career until his death in 2013.

As a classicist, Classen had an exceptional international reputation. He was invited as visiting professor to the University of Texas at Austin (1967/68) and as visiting member to the Institute for Advanced Study (1975). He also was visiting professor in Changchun (1992), Tartu (1994 and 1996), Rome (1995 and 1997) and visiting fellow at All Souls College, Oxford (1980) and Merton College, Oxford (1995). In 2000, the University of Tartu awarded him the honorary degree of Dr. phil.

His main scientific interests included Ancient Historiography, Greek and Roman Rhetorics, Roman Satire, Humanism and the History of Classical Scholarship. He was the author and editor of several monographs and essays on those subjects, his works being published in German, English, Serbian and Estonian.

Classen died on 29 September 2013, aged 85. He was survived by his wife Roswitha and their three sons.

Major writings 
 Untersuchungen zu Platons Jagdbildern. Hamburg 1951. Revised edition, Berlin 1960
 Sprachliche Deutung als Triebkraft platonischen und sokratischen Philosophierens. Munich 1959
 Sophistik. Darmstadt 1976
 Die Stadt im Spiegel der Descriptiones und Laudes urbium in der antiken und mittelalterlichen Literatur bis zum Ende des zwölften Jahrhunderts. Hildesheim/New York 1980
 Recht – Rhetorik – Politik: Untersuchungen zu Ciceros rhetorischer Strategie. Darmstadt 1985
 Probleme der Lukrezforschung. Hildesheim/Zurich/New York 1986
 Ansätze: Beiträge zum Verständnis der frühgriechischen Philosophie. Würzburg/Amsterdam 1986
 Zu Heinrich Bebels Leben und Schriften. Göttingen 1996
 Zur Literatur und Gesellschaft der Römer. Stuttgart 1998
 Rhetorical criticism of the New Testament. Tübingen 2000
 Antike Rhetorik im Zeitalter des Humanismus. Munich/Leipzig 2003
 Vorbilder – Werte – Normen in den homerischen Epen. Berlin/New York 2008.
 Aretai i virtutes: o vrednosnim predstavama i idealima kod Grka i Rimljana. Belgrade 2008
 Herrscher, Bürger und Erzieher: Beobachtungen zu den Reden des Isokrates. Hildesheim/Zurich/New York 2010
 Aretai und Virtutes: Untersuchungen zu den Wertvorstellungen der Griechen und Römer. Berlin/New York 2010

References

External links 
 Carl Joachim Classen at the University of Göttingen (German) 
 Obituary

1928 births
2013 deaths
German classical scholars
Writers from Hamburg
University of Göttingen alumni
University of Hamburg alumni
Academic staff of the University of Göttingen
Academic staff of the Technical University of Berlin
Academic staff of the University of Würzburg
Corresponding Members of the Academy of Athens (modern)